Elitzur Neve David Ramla is a basketball club based in Ramla in Israel. The club plays Liga Artzit in the third division of Israeli basketball. The club played in the Israeli Basketball Premier League in the 1987-88 season.

References

Sport in Ramla
Basketball teams in Israel
Basketball teams established in 1970
Former Israeli Basketball Premier League teams